Ragebul Ahsan Ripu is a Bangladesh Awami League politician and the incumbent Jatiya Sangsad member representing the Bogra-6 constituency since February 2023. He is serving as Awami League's Bogura district unit General Secretary since 2019.

Career 
Ripu elected as a joint secretary of Bogra District Awami League on 2015 council. He got nomination from Awami League on 3 January 2023.

References 

Living people
People from Bogra District
Awami League politicians
11th Jatiya Sangsad members
Year of birth missing (living people)